The 2019–20 season is Racing Club's 35th consecutive season in the top division of Argentine football. In addition to the Primera División, the club are competing in the Copa Argentina, Copa de la Superliga and Copa Libertadores.

The season generally covers the period from 1 July 2019 to 30 June 2020.

Review

Pre-season
Ricardo Centurión and Guillermo Fernández left for Mexican football on 14 June, having agreed terms with Atlético San Luis and Cruz Azul on 30 May and 13 June respectively; the former being a loan deal. On 8 June, Renzo Saravia was purchased by Primeira Liga side Porto. Three days later, Racing Club announced their first signing as Matías Rojas transferred from Cerro Porteño. Gonzalo Piovi departed on 24 June, penning a contract with Defensa y Justicia. Hours after, following his contract expiring, youngster Patricio Boolsen was signed by Santamarina. A swap with Atlético Tucumán was revealed on 27 June, as David Barbona switched spots with Augusto Lotti and Yonathan Cabral; the latter making his loan move permanent. Racing also paid $750k.

Barracas Central snapped up two Racing youngsters on loan on 28 June, with Gonzalo Córdoba and Alexis Cuello heading to Buenos Aires. Numerous loans from the previous campaign officially expired on and around 30 June. A fresh loan was confirmed on 1 July, as Santiago Rosales penned a season-long deal with Patronato. A fifth temporary outgoing was communicated a day later, with newly-promoted top-flight team Central Córdoba loaning Marcelo Meli. A scheduled friendly with Arsenal de Sarandí was cancelled on 2 July. 3 July saw Martín Pérez Guedes make a move to Indian football with Delhi Dynamos. Ricardo Noir and Juan Gabriel Patiño completed loans to Belgrano and Cerro Porteño on 4 July. Lautaro Arregui went to Santamarina on 5 July.

Martín Ojeda and Mariano Bareiro were loaned to fellow Primera División outfit Huracán on 5 July. Racing played friendlies with Chivas Florida whilst on their training camp of Orlando, United States and came away with a 5–0 aggregate win. A third youngster made the move to Santamarina on 7 July, as central midfielder Gustavo Iturra headed to Tandil. Atlanta concluded the loan signing of Héctor Villalba on 10 July. A second opponent of pre-season was met on 10 July, as they put five total goals past Florida Soccer Soldiers of the United Premier Soccer League. Walter Montoya was loaned in from Cruz Azul on 11 July. Racing ended their US tour with victories over Miami Sun and Naples United on 13 July. Sergio Vittor went out on loan to Banfield on 17 July.

July
Racing Club suffered a shock exit in the Copa Argentina on 21 July, as they were eliminated by Torneo Federal A's Boca Unidos at the round of sixty-four via a penalty shoot-out. Racing drew their Primera División opener on 26 July, as Unión Santa Fe held them to a scoreless draw on home soil. José Luis Rodríguez signed an eighteen-month loan contract with Racing from Danubio on 30 July.

August
Neri Cardozo departed Racing on 1 August, as he agreed a contract with Defensa y Justicia. Facundo Castillón also left, with him going to Greece with Levadiakos. Racing produced a second half comeback from two goals down to secure a point away to Vélez Sarsfield on 3 August. Braian Mansilla went off to Portuguese football on loan with Vitória Setúbal on 6 August. Evelio Cardozo scored as Racing beat Arsenal de Sarandí on 9 August, in an exhibition match that followed a goalless draw between the two earlier in the day. Eduardo Coudet got his fifth reinforcement on 13 August, as forward Nicolás Reniero came from San Lorenzo. Cristian Marcial was loaned by Platense on 15 August. Racing conceded six goals in a home loss to River Plate on 17 August.

Racing dropped further points on 25 August, as they drew 0–0 with newly-promoted Central Córdoba. Racing returned to winning ways on 31 August with a 3–1 victory over Godoy Cruz.

Squad

Transfers
Domestic transfer windows:3 July 2019 to 24 September 201920 January 2020 to 19 February 2020.

Transfers in

Transfers out

Loans in

Loans out

Friendlies

Pre-season
An exhibition match between Racing Club and Arsenal de Sarandí, set for 13 July, was revealed on 11 June 2019; though was later cancelled. Whilst training in Orlando, Florida, Racing met local sides Chivas Florida, Florida Soccer Soldiers, Miami Sun and Naples United in friendlies.

Mid-season
Racing would meet Arsenal de Sarandí in a mid-season friendly on 9 August in Sarandí at Racing's Predio Tita Mattiussi training complex.

Competitions

Primera División

League table

Relegation table

Source: AFA

Results summary

Matches
The fixtures for the 2019–20 campaign were released on 10 July.

Copa Argentina

Boca Unidos, of Torneo Federal A, were drawn to be Racing Club's round of sixty-four opponents in the Copa Argentina, with the tie scheduled to be played at the Estadio Ciudad de Lanús – Néstor Díaz Pérez on 21 July 2019; a neutral venue, as is customary in the competition.

Copa de la Superliga

Copa Libertadores

Squad statistics

Appearances and goals

Statistics accurate as of 1 September 2019.

Goalscorers

Notes

References

Racing Club de Avellaneda seasons
Racing Club